Nice 'n' Easy is an album by saxophonist Houston Person which was recorded in 2013 and released on the HighNote label.

Reception

For All About Jazz, Jack Bowers wrote: "Those who have heard Houston Person before will know pretty much what to expect from Nice 'n' Easy; those who haven't are in for a pleasant ride. Even though Person never strays from conventional norms, neither does he undervalue the music or its import, lending every tune the full measure of his attentiveness and ardor". In JazzTimes, Owen Cordle wrote: "Person is a connoisseur of melody, and he solos in a way that honors the rhythms of those melodies. He can alter his tone from tender restraint to joyful shouts. He is ever-soulful and is as capable of extroverted double-timing (“Bluesology”) as he is of economical exposition (“Ill Wind”). More young saxophonists should study the gospel according to Person".

Track listing 
 "Someday You'll Be Sorry" (Louis Armstrong) – 5:46
 "All My Tomorrows" (Jimmy Van Heusen, Sammy Cahn) – 5:37
 "Stolen Sweets" (Wild Bill Davis) – 5:01
 "It's All in the Game" (Charles G. Dawes, Carl Sigman) – 4:05
 "Nice 'n' Easy"  (Lew Spence, Alan Bergman, Marilyn Bergman) – 5:41
 "If It's the Last Thing I Do" (Saul Chaplin, Sammy Cahn) – 7:02
 "Ill Wind" (Harold Arlen, Ted Koehler) – 5:51
 "Let's Fall in Love" (Arlen, Koehler) – 3:53
 "Sweet Life" (Tadd Dameron) – 7:02
 "Bluesology" (Milt Jackson) – 5:49

Personnel 
Houston Person – tenor saxophone
John Di Martino – piano 
Chuck Redd – vibraphone
Ray Drummond – bass 
Lewis Nash – drums

References 

Houston Person albums
2013 albums
HighNote Records albums
Albums recorded at Van Gelder Studio